Gerald Wilford Byrne (February 2, 1907 – August 11, 1955) was a pitcher in Major League Baseball. He played for the Chicago White Sox in 1929.

References

External links

1907 births
1955 deaths
Major League Baseball pitchers
Chicago White Sox players
Baseball players from Michigan